Dead Man Walking is the fourth extended play from John Tibbs. Fair Trade Services released the EP on October 30, 2015, where it was his first release with the label. Tibbs worked with Ben Shive, in the production of this EP.

Critical reception

Matt Conner, rating the EP four stars from CCM Magazine, says, "Tibbs shows off several facets—an impressive roots-rock foundation, impeccable taste with guests like Ellie Holcomb, a true gift for the memorable melodic turn." Awarding the EP four and a half stars for Jesus Freak Hideout, Alex Caldwell states, "Tibbs' Dead Man Walking EP is a refreshing dose of spirit, grit and passion" Joshua Andre, giving the EP four stars at 365 Days of Inspiring Media, writes, "John’s music is some of the most vulnerable and emotional songs I have heard in a long time!"

Track list

References

2015 EPs